The 1960 Singapore Open, also known as the 1960 Singapore Open Badminton Championships, took place from 8 – 12 June 1960 at the Singapore Badminton Hall in Singapore.

Venue
Singapore Badminton Hall

Final results

References 

Singapore Open (badminton)
1960 in badminton